Riders of Destiny is a 1933 pre-Code Western musical film starring 26-year-old John Wayne as Singin' Sandy Saunders, the screen's second singing cowboy (the first being Ken Maynard in the 1929 film The Wagon Master). It was the first of a series of sixteen Lone Star Westerns made for Monogram Pictures between 1933-1935, by Wayne and director Robert N. Bradbury, and the first pairing of Wayne with George "Gabby" Hayes.

Plot 
The movie begins with Saunders riding his horse and singing on his guitar when he finds Sheriff Bill Baxter tottering in the desert after being shot in the back. The scene cuts to Saunders witnessing Ms. Fay Denton robbing a stagecoach owned by Mr. Kincaid and when she attempts to get away her horse is shot from under her. Saunders rescues her, gives her his horse and then evades the captors attempting to find him.

Ms. Fay turns up to the Sheriffs office to report that her horse has been stolen. The town "land and water" developer Mr. Kincaid seems to be running things and he attempts to console her. Kincaid and his henchmen have been plotting to hoard the water in the region, charge the landowners extortionist rates for the water supply and then convince them to hand over their lands. They have also been stealing Denton's proceeds from a claim in a mine.

When Kincaid and his men recover Ms. Fay's saddle they return it to her at the ranch but notice that Saunders' horse is there. They suspect Saunders of being the stagecoach robber and lay a trap for him. Saunders walks into the trap but easily outguns the two henchmen that Kincaid sent to kill him.

Meanwhile the towns people are arguing about what to do with Kincaid who is extorting them & compelling them to sell their land at a very low price. Kincaid as retaliation cuts off their water. In response the land owners try to steal some water. Saunders helps but the coach driver is shot and dies. Kincaid then hires Bert to take down Saunders in a town square duel. Saunders easily wounds and disarms Bert.

Kincaid then attempts to bribe and hire Saunders. Saunders plays along and convinces Kincaid to blow up the well on the Denton property so they have no water and have to sell the property to Kincaid. Kincaid's men blow up the well but the well ends up springing a fountain head of water which turns into a river. Kincaid gets upset over this and murders his henchman Bert and runs for his life only to perish in the river.

Saunders returns to the Denton's and as he is about to leave Ms. Fay, she tells him she does not want him to leave. He tells her that he will be back for supper and to bake him a few hundred biscuits. As Saunders rides off into the distance Ms. Fay runs in happily to bake a hundred biscuits.

See also
 John Wayne filmography

Notes

Wayne's singing voice was dubbed, and the film is considerably darker than the Gene Autry singing cowboy movies that followed it; for example, Singin' Sandy's ten-gallon hat was black instead of white and he would grimly chant about "streets soon running with blood" and "you'll be drinking your drinks with the dead" as he strode purposefully down the street toward a showdown. Equally dark, the bad man in the film says he has made the ranchers "an offer they can't refuse."  The supporting cast includes George "Gabby" Hayes, the acrobatic comedian Al St. John, and the stuntman Yakima Canutt. The movie was written and directed by Robert N. Bradbury. It was the first of the Lone Star Productions released through Metro Goldwyn Mayer. The actual singer, who was singing as this film and Lawless Range were being made, was Bill Bradbury, son of director Robert N. Bradbury and brother of Robert A. Bradbury a.k.a. Bob Steele. Glenn Strange did the singing in Lawless Range.

Wayne's dubbed singing, which bore no resemblance to his unique speaking voice, was the reason he soon abandoned the singing cowboy format, as he later played a singing cowboy—though not Singin' Sandy—at least once, in Lawless Range, but he was embarrassed during personal appearances when he couldn't accommodate children who clamored for a Singin' Sandy song. Gene Autry was chosen by the studio as Wayne's replacement in the new genre, immediately solving the live singing problem while ushering in a much lighter take on the format than Wayne's grimly intense rendition.

Cast

 John Wayne as Singin' Sandy Saunders
 Cecilia Parker as Fay Denton
 Forrest Taylor as James Kincaid
 George "Gabby" Hayes as Charlie Denton (billed as George Hayes)
 Al St. John as henchman Bert
 Heinie Conklin as henchman Elmer
 Yakima Canutt as henchman
 Earl Dwire as Slip Morgan
 Lafe McKee as Sheriff Bill Baxter
 Addie Foster as Mrs. Mason
 Silver Tip Baker as townsman (uncredited)
 Horace B. Carpenter as rancher (uncredited)
 William Dyer as rancher (uncredited)

External links

 
 
 

1933 films
1930s English-language films
Films directed by Robert N. Bradbury
American black-and-white films
1930s Western (genre) musical films
Monogram Pictures films
American Western (genre) musical films
Articles containing video clips
1930s American films